Thomas H. Eviston (died September 8, 1860) was an American politician and businessman.

Eviston was born to John W. Eviston, Sr. and his wife in north Ireland. He was the brother of John W. Eviston, Jr., Thomas Eviston, and Martin J. Eviston. The family first settled in Providence, Rhode Island before moving to Milwaukee, Wisconsin in 1842.

Eviston worked as a lumber dealer, and was the chief engineer of Milwaukee's volunteer fire department. In 1857 he was elected railroad commissioner for Milwaukee's Third Ward. In 1859, he was elected to the Wisconsin State Assembly.

Eviston and his wife died when the Lady Elgin shipwrecked in 1860.

References
 James Smith Buck, Pioneer History of Milwaukee: 1854-1860 Milwaukee: Swain & Tate: 1886. p. 114. https://books.google.com/books?id=J3k1AAAAIAAJ
 Memoirs of Milwaukee County : from the earliest historical times down to the present, including a genealogical and biographical record of representative families in Milwaukee County. Madison, Wisconsin: Western Historical Association, 1909. OCLC 3347831. p. 164. Reprinted by La Crosse, Wisconsin: Brookhaven Press, 2000.
"Fearful Disaster on Lake Michigan; The Steamer Lady Elgin Sunk by Collision with a Schooner."  New York Times, September 1, 1860.

Deaths due to shipwreck
1860 deaths
Members of the Wisconsin State Assembly
Irish emigrants to the United States (before 1923)
Year of birth missing